Paraethria is a genus of moth in the subfamily Arctiinae.

Selected species
Paraethria angustipennis Rothschild, 1911
Paraethria flavosignata Rothschild, 1911
Paraethria mapiria Draudt, 1915
Paraethria triseriata Herrich-Schäffer, 1855

References
Natural History Museum Lepidoptera generic names catalog

Arctiinae